The European Film Gateway (EFG) is a single access point to the digitized holdings of historical European film documents from numerous film archives and cinematheques, including over 600,000 individual objects from over 60 collections. The European Film Gateway gives access to images, textual materials, and moving images. The vast contents include film stills, set photos, posters, set drawings, portrait photographs, scripts, correspondences, film censorship and visa rulings, out-of-print books, film programs and reviews, as well as newsreels, documentaries, commercials, and feature films. The portal facilitates access to the archives which hold the original materials.

Background
The online portal European Film Gateway is the main outcome of the EU-funded project “EFG – European Film Gateway”. Working with 22 partner organizations from 16 European countries, EFG addressed issues for access to digital content, namely, technical and semantic interoperability, metadata standards, practices for rights’ clearance, and Intellectual Property Rights (IPR) management of cinematographic works. The project was coordinated by the Deutsches Filminstitut (DIF) and funded by the European Commission under eContentplus, the Information and Communication Technologies Policy Support Programme (ICT PSP). It ran from September 2008 to August 2011 was supported by the Association des Cinematheques Europeennes (ACE) as well as the EDL Foundation.

Key issues

Technical interoperability and access
All metadata provided by the contributing archives is stored centrally in the EFG metadata repository, which was developed in the EFG project. The EFG metadata model is mostly based on the EN 15907: Film identification - Enhancing interoperability of metadata - Element sets and structures standard. Also other models, such as FRBR as well as WPE defined by the OLAC have been considered during establishing the EFG data model.

The multilingual and non-standardised metadata delivered by content providers is harmonised and cleaned before it is ingested in the EFG system. In contrast to the metadata, which is stored centrally, the digital objects remain on individual online platforms run by the archives. Deep links refer the user directly to the objects.

The EFG implemented the technology developed by the Digital Repository Infrastructure Vision for European Research (DRIVER) project. This open service system enables the creation and maintenance of infrastructures capable of supporting the construction of Information Spaces of digital objects collected from various archives. It also permits the creation of service-oriented applications where services can be shared and re-used in other contexts.

IPR management and administration
The EFG project assessed copyright regulations and legal framework for online use of archival contents through research reports on open content models as well as working with organisations engaged with online publishing of copyrighted archival film material. EFG provided individual network partners with tools for consultations with representatives from rights owners’ and producers’ organisations in order to make the archival material available online.

Follow-up project

EFG1914 is the follow-up project of EFG. It began in February 2012 and runs for two years. Coinciding with the centenary of the First World War, EFG1914 focuses on the digitization of films and other documents from and relating to the war, making the contents available through the European Film Gateway and Europeana. Like EFG, it is funded by the European Commission and coordinated by Deutsches Filminstitut. The project consortium consists of 26 partners, 21 of which are film archives.

To date, only about 20% of the silent film production of the time remains safe-guarded in the archives and was largely unavailable to the public. EFG1914 significantly simplifies access to these films, covering various fields, from newsreels to documentary, fiction, and propaganda films. EFG1914 also includes anti-war films produced after 1918, which reveal the tragedies of the 1910s.

EFG and Europeana
The European Film Gateway is linked to Europeana, the digital showcase of Europe's cultural and scientific heritage. Europeana.eu offers search capabilities through millions of digital objects provided by Europe's museums and galleries, archives, libraries and audio-visual organisations.

Partners and contributors

See also
 Europeana

References

External links
 European Film Gateway
 First World War Films on the European Film Gateway
 EFG Project Website (2008-2011)
 EFG1914 Project Website (2012-2014) 
 Europeana.eu
 Association des Cinémathèques Européennes (ACE)
 Metadata Standards for Cinematographic Works (CEN 15744 + CEN 15907)

German digital libraries
Information technology organizations based in Europe
Internet and the European Union